The Three Hundred Tang Poems is an anthology of poems from the Chinese Tang dynasty (618–907). It was first compiled around 1763 by Sun Zhu (1722–1778), who was a Qing Dynasty scholar and was also known as Hengtang Tuishi ("Retired Master of Hengtang"). Various later editions also exist. All editions contain slightly more than 300 total poems. The number 300 (or more exactly 305) was a classic number for a poetry collection due to the influence of the Classic of Poetry (Shijing), which was generally known as The Three Hundred Poems.

Dissatisfied with the anthology Poems by a Thousand Masters (Qianjiashi) compiled by Liu Kezhuang in the late Southern Song, and influenced by Ming Dynasty poetry anthologies, Sun selected the poems based on their popularity and educational value. The collection has been popular ever since and can be found in many Chinese households. For centuries, elementary students memorized the poems and used them to learn to read and write. It contains poems by Du Fu, Li Bai, Wang Wei, Chen Zi'ang, Meng Haoran, Han Yu, Du Mu, Bai Juyi, Liu Changqing, Cen Shen, Wang Changling, Wei Yingwu, and more.

Organization of poems

The original Qing Dynasty version of the 300 Tang Poems was organized by the poem's formal type, of which there were seven:

Folk song styled verse (yuefu)
Ancient verse (gushi):
Five-character ancient verse
Seven-character ancient verse
Modern style verse (jintishi):
Eight-line regulated verse (lüshi):
Five-character regular verse
Seven-character regular verse
Quatrain (jueju):
Five-character quatrain
Seven-character quatrain

Out of 317 poems in one edition, 90 were in the gushi form and 227 were in the lüshi or the jueju forms.

Poets
The poets of the Tang shi include a number of authors ranging from the well-known and famous to obscure or anonymous poets, and even include at least one emperor. The poet with the most pieces included in this collection is Du Fu, with thirty-nine. Li Bai is a close runner-up, with thirty-four. Wang Wei has twenty-nine poems included in the anthology and Li Shangyin has twenty-four. Meng Haoran has fifteen, Wei Yingwu twelve, Liu Changqing eleven, and Du Mu ten. After that, each of the other poets' included pieces number in the single digits; however, some of these poets are quite important, such as Liu Zongyuan or Bai Juyi. Some important poets, such as Li He, are not represented at all.

Translations
The first complete translation of the Three Hundred Tang Poems into English was published as The Jade Mountain, translated by Witter Bynner and Jiang Kanghu. From 1929 through 1972 it went through ten editions. A new translation of the anthology by Peter Harris was published in 2009.

See also
Classical Chinese poetry
Gao Bing
List of poems in Chinese or by Chinese poets
Tang poetry
Qing poetry
Quantangshi
Sun Zhu

References

Sources 
Wu, John C. H. (1972). The Four Seasons of Tang Poetry. Rutland, Vermont: Charles E. Tuttle. 
Watson, Burton (1971). CHINESE LYRICISM: Shih Poetry from the Second to the Twelfth Century. (New York: Columbia University Press). 
Rexroth, Kenneth (1970). Love and the Turning Year: One Hundred More Poems from the Chinese. New York: New Directions.
Yu, Pauline (2002). "Chinese Poetry and Its Institutions", in Hsiang Lectures on Chinese Poetry, Volume 2, Grace S. Fong, editor. Montreal: Center for East Asian Research, McGill University.

External links

www.zhongwen.com
300 Tang Poems at the University of Virginia Library
 

1763 books
Chinese poetry anthologies
Three Hundred Tang
Tang dynasty poetry